Siane Rural LLG is a local-level government (LLG) of Chimbu Province, Papua New Guinea. The Siane language is spoken in the LLG.

Wards
01. Kereku
02. Waisime
03. Murefaku
04. Marefaku
05. Nime-Kaupa
06. Mi-Fokowe
07. Kumogu
08. Atinogu
09. Irafaiufa
10. Komuni No. 1
11. Famundi
12. Seine
13. Rabiufa
14. Rumbuiufa
15. Andomono
16. Feremena
17. Wafo
18. Lofaifo
19. Loanoi
20. Nomanena
21. Kemami
22. Nomane
23. Norifo
24. Komborufa
25. Foinawa
26. Komni No. 2
27. Kifiufa

References

Local-level governments of Chimbu Province